Ana Victória Pitts (born 1991) is a Brazilian mezzo-soprano who has performed internationally.

Career 
Pitts was born in Belém in 1991 and was first trained there. She made her stage debut in Belém in 2010 as Dido in Purcell's Dido and Aeneas. She received a scholarship and continued her studies in Italy from 2011 at the Rovigo conservatoire, where she graduated in 2014. In 2011, Pitts won the Young Promise Award at the International Sacred Music Competition in Rome.

Pitts was a member of the studio of the Maggio Musicale Fiorentino from 2015 to 2017, where she appeared in Ullmann's Der Kaiser von Atlantis, as Hänsel in Humperdinck's Hänsel und Gretel, Flora in Verdi's La Traviata, and Tisbe in Rossini's La Cenerentola. She performed the alto part in Mozart's Requiem at the Maggio Musicale with the festival choir and the Orchestra della Toscana conducted by Daniele Rustioni. She took part in tours of Oman and Tunisia. She also performed as Isabella in Rossini's L'italiana in Algeri and as Tangia in Gluck's Le cinesi. She recorded the role of Publia in Rossini's Aureliano in Palmira in a live performance from the 2017 Rossini Festival in Wildbad, with Juan Francisco Gatell in the title role.

In 2018, she appeared at the Opera de Lyon for the first time, as Vecchietta and Duchessa in Respighi's La bella dormente nel bosco. In 2022, she portrayed characters in all three parts of Puccini's Il Trittico at the Oper Frankfurt in a 2008 production directed by Claus Guth and conducted by Pier Giorgio Morandi. In Il tabarro, she performed as Frugola, in Suor Angelica as the Duchess, and in Gianni Schicchi as Zita; She appeared alongside Željko Lučić and Elza van den Heever in leading roles. A reviewer from noted that she was a powerful presence in voice and expression ("mit einer starken Präsenz an Stimme und Ausdruck").

References

External links 
 Victória Pitts / Mezzo-soprano Operabase
 Victoria Pitts (management) primafila-artists.com

21st-century Brazilian women opera singers
People from Belém
Living people
Mezzo-sopranos
1991 births